William Deedes (11 October 1834 – 27 May 1887) was an English cricketer and a Conservative Party politician. He was born in Saltwood and died in Saltwood Castle.

Cricket 
Deedes made a single first-class appearance in 1853 for Gentlemen of Kent - aged just eighteen. Deedes playing as a lower-order batsman, scored three runs in each of the two innings in which he batted, both times being caught by William Nicholson and bowled by Edward Drake.

Deedes' father, also named William, and uncle John, also played first-class cricket.

Politics 
Deedes was elected to the House of Commons as a Member of Parliament (MP) for East Kent at an unopposed by-election in July 1876, following the resignation of the Conservative MP Sir Wyndham Knatchbull.  His father had previously represented the same constituency, from 1845 to 1857 and from 1857 to 1862, but William junior's political career was shorter, as he stood down from Parliament at the 1880 general election.

References

External links 
 
 

1834 births
1887 deaths
Conservative Party (UK) MPs for English constituencies
UK MPs 1874–1880
English cricketers
Gentlemen of Kent cricketers